Dera Sach Khand Ballan is a socio-religious social organization (dera) of Chamars based in the village of Ballan near Jalandhar, Punjab, India. It was founded by devotees of Guru Ravidas.

Dera Sach Khand Ballan is devoted to the cause of leading common masses towards a spiritual path. The spiritual heads of the Dera have initiated millions of people and bestowed them with "Naamdaan". They have also adopted the mission of spreading the teachings and bani "sacred writings" of Guru Ravidass throughout India as well as in foreign countries.

The Dera has built a temple at Seer Goverdhanpur Varanasi U.P., the birthplace of Guru Ravidass. Every year they gather in Lakhs on the occasion of Guruji's birthday. The Dera has also built many Darbars in the name of Guru Ravidass in other Indian areas including Sirsagarh in Haryana and Katraj in Pune. The Dera has also managed to establish the Ravidassia religion, due to the fact of discrimination and the assassination of Ramanand.

The Dera has built charitable hospitals and a school for providing health and education for the poor and needy. The Dera spreads the philosophy of Ravidass through the publication of various books, periodicals as well as visual media such as CDs, DVDs, and tapes. The Dera encourages scholars who either carry out research on Ravidass or bring out publications on related subjects. Thus far 22 scholars have been awarded gold medals for their contribution in this area.

Leaders and successors

Pipal Dass (1895-1928) 
 started the movement of teaching the principles of Ravidassia Religion to devotees. Pipal Dass, hailed from the village Gill Patti, District Bathinda (Punjab). His original name was Harnam Dass. His parents were of a religious nature. He was married to Shobhawanti. He and his wife had two sons named Sewa Dass and Sarwan Dass. After the sad demise of Shobhawanti, Pipal Dass left village Gill Patti along with his son Sarwan Dass. After traveling through various villages Pipal Dass reached village Sarmastpur near Jalandhar. After a short stay in this village, he moved to the village of Ballan near Jalandhar. The people of Ballan showed utmost regard to Baba. Therefore, he decided to stay there along with his son Sarwan Dass at the place where the original Dera is situated at present. There was a dry Pipal tree near this place of worship. Pipal Dass started watering this Pipal tree which ultimately became green in due course of time. People of the village, having seen this miracle, started calling Pipal Dass.

He was a scholar of Punjabi and well-versed in the Bani of Guru Granth Sahib. Slowly the people from nearby villages started coming to Baba for spiritual guidance. Thus Pipal Dass established the Dera in the village where the followers of Guru Ravidass started paying their obeisance. Throughout his life, Pipal Dass blessed his disciples with "Naamdaan" and fulfilled their wishes.

Pipal Dass left for his heavenly abode in 1928 on the 13th shradh (lunar month). The present Gaddi-Nashin of the Dera, Niranjan Dass was keen to build a suitable memorial at village Gill Patti. In this village, there was a piece of land that belonged to his family. On this land, there was a historic "Ber" tree planted by Pipal Dass. At this site, a memorial was established by Dera Sarwan Dass on 5 July 2008. A "murti" (marble sculpture) was installed by Niranjan Dass.

Sarwan Dass (1928-1972) 
Sarwan Dass preached the philosophy and teachings of Guru Ravidass among the socially backward and downtrodden throughout his life. He remained very distressed by the fact that there was no memorial to Guru Ravidass in the city of Varanasi, though many Kings and Queens were his disciples. Sarwan Dass, being a great spiritual, visionary, and revolutionary saint, undertook the task of perpetuating the memory of Guru at Varanasi and giving a befitting memorial in his name. He assigned the task of tracing the birthplace of Guru in the city of Varanasi to a select group of people. The group went to Varanasi and surveyed the area near the Banaras Hindu University. The "imlee" tree and other indicators confirmed a location in the village Seer Goverdhanpur, on the outskirts of Varanasi near Banaras Hindu University, as the birthplace of Guru Ravidass. A plot of land was purchased and no time was lost to start the construction of an impressive temple. Sarwan Dass deputed his first disciple Hari Dass along with a large number of devotees of Dera Bal to start the construction of the Mandir. Hari Dass laid the foundation stone of the Mandir on Monday 14 June 1965 on Ashad Sankranti. As soon as the foundation stone was laid no time was lost in starting the construction of the Mandir in full swing. Sarwan Dass assigned the duty of construction work to his second disciple Garib Dass, who along with large "Jathas" (groups of people) of Dera "Sewadars" (Stewards) worked in the most difficult and unfavorable conditions to complete the construction of the first phase of the Mandir in 1970. In this endeavor, help came from the public at large from within as well as from outside the country. The Guru's devotees residing in the U.K. and other foreign countries were also keen to see the project completed and they contributed according to their respective capacities.

In December 1970 a huge conference of prominent leaders such as Mangu Ram Mugowalia, Dilip Singh, Kulwant Singh from Himachal Pradesh, Captain Bhagu Ram, and many others from the Dalit community and a very large number of people from other states of India like Punjab, Himachal Pradesh, J & K and Haryana was held at Dera Sachkhand Ballan. Many resolutions concerning the community were passed. Through one of the resolutions passed at this conference, all the delegates expressed gratitude to Sarwan Dass for building a Mandir at the birthplace of Shri Guru Ravidass and at the same time nominated him to be the chairman of the committee formed for the continued construction as well as for managing the affairs of the Mandir.

All the followers of Guru Ravidass throughout the world will remain indebted to Sarwan Dass for giving them this place of pilgrimage, where people gather in large numbers to pay their obeisance throughout the year as well as on the Jayanti (birthday) celebration of Guru.

Sarwan Dass left for his heavenly abode on 11 June 1972 leaving behind a rich legacy. During his lifetime itself, Dera Sachkhand Bal had acquired a prominent status among a large number of followers of Guru Ravidass from within India as well as abroad. These followers draw their inspiration and seek spiritual guidance from the Dera. Recognizing the services being rendered by the Dera the public is contributing generously to the construction and running of hospitals and schools devoted to the memory of Sarwan Dass.

Hari Dass (1972-1982) 

Hari Dass was the third Gaddi-Nashin (spiritual leader) of Dera Sachkhand, Ballan. Hari Dass was born in 1895 at village Garha in the Jalandhar district. His father was Hukum Chand and his mother was Taabi. He used to take interest in religious matters since his childhood.

Hari Dass had heard about Pipal Dass from the followers of Baba. He showed keen interest to meet Baba. After meeting with Pipal Dass, Hari Dass requested Baba to give him the gift of "Naam". Pipal Dass accepted his request and initiated him. After receiving "Naam", Hari Dass devoted his entire life to serving Baba & later his son Sarwan Dass.

Sarwan Dass always kept Hari Dass with him, showed great affection for him, and deputed him for important religious duties. He was specially assigned the task of laying the foundation stone of Shri Guru Ravidass Janam Asthan Mandir at Seer Goverdhanpur, Varanasi. This was done by him on 14 June 1965 along with the followers of Dera Sachkhand Bal.

After Sarwan Dass left for his heavenly abode on 11 June 1972, Hari Dass was installed as Gaddi-Nashin (spiritual leader) of Dera Sachkhand, Bal.

Hari Dass started the construction of the temple at Dera Bal on 10 Aug 1972 in the memory of Sarwan Dass. Within one year the construction of the temple was completed and it was inaugurated on 11 June 1973 on the first Barsi Samagam (anniversary celebration) of Sarwan Dass. The murti marble sculpture of Sarwan Dass was placed in the temple. This temple is famously known as "Dera Sachkhand Bal".He also constructed a hall for the devotees. This hall is known as the "Hari Dass Satsang Hall".

He was against child marriage. He bestowed "Naamdaan" on thousands of disciples. Throughout their life, his disciple Garib Dass had been serving the people by providing Ayurvedic Medicines.

Hari Dass left for his heavenly abode on 6 Feb 1982. In the memory of Hari Dass, every year on 7 February, the Hari Manav Unity saint conference is celebrated in Sarwan Dass Charitable Hospital at Kathar district Jalandhar.

Garib Dass (1982-1994) 

Garib Dass was born in 1925 in a village called Jalbhe which is in the Jalandhar district. His father was Nanak Chand and his mother was Har Kaur. When he was only six months old his father expired. After this tragic incident, his mother took care of the little child. He was the youngest of five brothers.

He used to visit Dera Sachkhand Ballan occasionally. The teaching and ideology of Sarwan Dass impressed him greatly. So he started coming to the Dera more often. Within a short period, he won the heart of Sarwan Dass.

Kartar Chand took the 13-year-old Garib Dass to Ludhiana for helping him in the business of silk weaving. There he received a letter from Sarwan Dass asking him to come to the Dera immediately for some urgent work. Without wasting any time he reached the Dera. There he was instructed to remain in the Dera from that point onwards. He followed the instructions of Sarwan Dass politely and humbly.

One day Sarwan Dass told him, "Garib Dass, detach yourself from the materialistic world and serve the Almighty God." "Har ke naam bin jhuthe sakal pasare". Garib Dass was very obediently prostrated at the feet of Sarwan Dass and vowed to devote his whole life to the service of Almighty God and Humanity. Apart from delving into the fathoms of Gurbani, he learned to prepare Ayurvedic medicines and treated many patients who came to the Dera with various ailments. The young boy had now grown in wisdom and stature under the patronage of Sarwan Dass and in the company of Hari Dass. Therefore, Sarwan Dass used to entrust him with many jobs of responsibility. It is a well known fact that the birthplace of Sri Guru Ravidass at Seer Goverdhanpur, Varanasi been traced thanks to Sarwan Dass. He deputed Hari Dass to lay the foundation stone of the temple to be constructed there. But it was Garib Dass, who was entrusted with the responsibility to develop and complete the construction of the temple. He used to lead a team of sewadars (stewards) to Varanasi for this purpose. Construction of the temple was completed by him in the most difficult weather conditions & challenging circumstances.

When Garib Dass became the Gaddi-Nashin (spiritual leader) of Dera Sachkhand Bal on 7 February 1982 he wanted to construct a hospital in the memory of his Guru, for giving medical aid to poor people. A milestone in the history of the Dera Sachkhand Bal was created on 22 October 1982 when Garib Dass laid the foundation stone for Sarwan Dass Charitable Hospital at village Sheypoor-Kapoor, Adda Kathar. This hospital made a humble beginning with its inauguration on 1 January 1984. Today it is a 150-bed hospital providing quality service in eight specialties at very nominal rates to the people who cannot afford costly medical aid. For those people who cannot meet even the nominal rates, the expenditure is met by Dera Sachkhand Bal. Additionally, all expenditure of a capital nature such as machinery or building extensions is met by the Dera.

He was a great Saint who also understood the importance of having a newspaper, which would serve the cause of the community. So he started a weekly named ‘Begumpura Shehar’, thus giving a voice to the poor people.

During his lifetime the Sachkhand temple, Hari Dass Bhawan, Langar Hall, and a major portion of Yatri Niwas at the Dera were built.

He laid the foundation stone of Sarwan Dass Teaching Block in the I.T.I (Industrial Training Institute) at Phagwara and got a spacious hall built there. He has also constructed many ‘Guru-Ghars’ (temples) in various cities in India and abroad.

During his lifetime, he wanted to see the Janam Asthan Mandir at Varanasi in full glow. He got "Swarn Kalash" (gold minarets) installed at the Mandir in the presence of Kanshi Ram (President of the Bahujan Samaj Party). He paid a historic visit to the mandir along with a number of Dera followers from 16 June to 23 June 1994 as if he had a premonition that he will be leaving this world very soon.

Niranjan Dass (1994-present) 

Niranjan Dass was born on 5 January 1942 at village Ramdass Pur near Alawalpur in district Jalandhar. His father’s name was Sadhu Ram and his mother’s name was Rukmini. His father and mother were devotees of Pipal Dass and Sarwan Dass. Whenever they were free from home chores they used to visit Dera Ballan and listen to the holy words and do Seva at the Dera. He was always accompanied by their loving son Niranjan Dass. Sarwan Dass was very happy to see the child and used to listen to the sweet words from the child.

Sadhu Ram, father of Niranjan Dass decided to offer his son at the holy feet of Sarwan Dass. From that point onwards Niranjan Dass remained at the Dera and started doing Sewa at the Dera-attending to miscellaneous jobs which he used to do running about. Seeing the speed at which he used to perform his tasks, Sarwan Dass named him "Hawaigar" ("speedy one"). He grew up doing service at the feet of Sarwan Dass and later with Hari Dass and Garib Dass. After Garib Dass left for his heavenly abode on 23 July 1994, Niranjan Dass was installed as Gaddi-Nashin (spiritual leader) of Dera Sachkhand Bal on 9 August 1994. He started with the development of all projects devoted to the service of humankind in right earnest and the Dera has made tremendous progress under his guidance.

Overview
Dera Sach Khand Ballan is a Ravidassia organization. Many followers of the Dera Sach Khand are former untouchables and Sikhs. 
It was founded by devotees of Shri Guru Ravidas.
In May 2009 armed assailants were reported to have attacked Guru Ravidass temple in Vienna, Austria, seriously injuring the head of the Dera Sach Khand and killing another leader, Sant Ramanand.  

News of the attack on the temple triggered riots in Punjab, and across northern India.

Ramanand Dass (From 1952 to 2009)

Some unique personalities take birth in this wonderful world and become immortal through their great deeds in service to society. However true saints are beacons of enlightenment for the entire humanity. Divisions based on country borders, colour, caste, and creed are meaningless for them.

Rama Nand’s father Mehnga Ram and other ancestors, who were devotees of Dera Sachkhand Ballan, migrated from village Ballan during 1910-15 to settle down at village Alawalpur, district Jalandhar. Nature finds unique ways to create new historic events. Something similar happened in the lives of this family. Leading a normal married life, Mehnga Ram and Jeet Kaur never thought that they would be blessed with a son who would unite the entire depressed community like beads of a rosary and play a marvelous role in bringing all round glory to a place of worship Dera Sachkhand Ballan known to the whole world which future generations shall always be really proud of. Because of the untiring efforts of Niranjan Dass and Rama Nand, now Dera Sachkhand Ballan is known as Mecca for all humanity and especially for dalits. It has always been the motto of present spiritual leaders to understand and appreciated the great legacy of past spiritual leaders and move forwards on the footprints left by them.

Rama Nand was born on 2 February 1952 in the house of blessed parents Mehnga Ram and Jeet Kaur. He was of saintly nature from the very birth. His charming looks created a captivating spell on the people of the locality. He completed his graduation from Doaba College, Jalandhar. He invariably used to be in deep thoughts as a student. He liked company of saints from his childhood which had to lead him to divine enlightenment because of his devotion. Some members of the family started strong opposition demanding that Ramanand should be kept away from the company of saints. There were frequent religious discourse in the house. Rama Nand used to pray to God every moment in meditation even while carrying out domestic work. Ultimately, Rama Nand was at service of the sacred feet of Hari Dass, Dera Sachkhand, Ballan. He was blessed with ‘Naamdaan’ by Hari Dass. Rama Nand continued meditation of God while staying in the beautiful temple built in memory of Pipal Dass at village Ballan from 1973 onwards. Rama Nand remained in service of the devotees and conducted religious discourses singing devotional hymns daily during the lifetimes of Hari Dass and Garib Dass.

It is worth elaboration here that Rama Nand received ‘Naamdaan’ from Hari Dass and he was initiated as a saint by Garib Dass. He also had the good fortune of travelling with the latter to several countries for preaching and spread of teaching of Shri Guru Ravidass. Latter he visited several countries under the directions of present spiritual head Niranjan Dass and helped construction of many temples and linking devotees in foreign countries with the preaching of Shri Guru Ravidass. He endeared himself amongst all foreign devotees. Devotees were left spell bound after listening to the sweet melodies of his spiritual discourses.

He was an able administrator who managed the affairs of Dera in an elegant manner. While preaching and spreading the teachings of Shri Guru Ravidass through congregation of saints throughout the world, he always played leading role in carrying out the various tasks in the service of humanity under many charitable projects run by Dera Sachkhand Ballan. He provided praise-worthy services as Editor of ‘Begampura Shaher’ published by Dera Sachkhand Ballan for which he was honored by Dalit Literary Academy with a prestigious award. It was for the first time when he created history delivering his speech about Shri Guru Ravidass at the House of Commons in United Kingdom. He was a great scholar of Gurbani and expert in explaining complicated details of same through extremely simple examples. Whenever he rendered hymns accompanied by spiritual music, all devotees present at the site remained spell bound.

Not only he established Shri Guru Ravidass Sangeet Academy at Dera Sachkhand Ballan but his visionary instincts could identified many talented missionary singers, poets and writers who were honored with gold medals. Jalandhar Doordarshan telecasts programmes named "Amritbani Shri Guru Ravidass" and "Begampura Shahar Ka Nao" rendered in his captivating voice.

Rama Nand made very special contribution to the construction of buildings of various institutions being run by Dera Sachkhand Ballan.

Begumpura Shaher
Begumpura Shaher is a Punjabi-English-Hindi trilingual, when Garib Dass became Gaddi-Nashin (Leader) of Dera Sachkhand Ballan on 7 February 1982. The great Saint also understood the importance of having a newspaper, therefore he started a newspaper named "Begumpura Shaher" in 1991.

Surinder Dass Bawa is the Chief Editor of Begumpura Shaher and had founder editor Shaheed Ramanand Dass.

Social responsibility and development
Some of the developments which took place during this period are as follows:-

1. Laid the foundation stone of the Shri Guru Ravidass Janam Sthan at Seer Goverdhanpur in Varanasi in 1972 under the stewardship of Garib Dass.
2. Laid the foundation stone of the Shri Guru Ravidass Gate at Varanasi on 25 May 1997 by the then National President of Bahujan Samaj Party Saheb Kanshi Ram.
3. The inauguration of the gate was done on 16 July 1998 by the then President of India Shri K. R. Narayanan.
4. Laid the foundation stone of the Sarwan Dass Model School at Hadiabad, Phagwara on 16 April 2002 by Niranjan Dass.
5. The inauguration of the school was done by Niranjan Dass on 5 April 2004.
   6. Laid the foundation stone of the Shri Guru Ravidass Satsang Bhawan on 12 March 2000 by Niranjan Dass.
7. Shri Guru Ravidass Satsang Bhawan Inaugurated on 15 February 2007 on the birthday celebration of Sarwan Dass.
8. Laid the foundation stone of the Sarwan Dass Charitable Eye Hospital at Dera Sachkhand Bal on 10 November 2004 by Niranjan Dass.
9. Sarwan Dass Charitable Eye Hospital Inauguration on 15 February 2007 on the birthday celebration of Sarwan Dass.
10. The holy Swarn Palki (gold palanquin) was installed in Shri Guru Ravidass Satsang Bhawan on 15 February 2007 on the birthday celebration of Sarwan Dass by Niranjan Dass.
11. The holy Swarn Palki (gold palanquin) was installed in Shri Guru Ravidass Janam Asthan Mandir Varanasi on 21 February 2008 on the birthday celebration of Shri Guru Ravidass Maharaj.
12. Laid the foundation stone of Shri Guru Ravidass Mandir, Sirsagarh Haryana on 31 July 2003 by Niranjan Dass.
13. The inauguration of Shri Guru Ravidass Mandir, Sirsagarh Haryana was done by Niranjan Dass on 31 July 2005.
 14. Laid the foundation stone of Shri Guru Ravidass Mandir, Katraj Pune, Maharashtra was done by Niranjan Dass on 7 December 2003.
15. The inauguration of Shri Guru Ravidass Mandir, Katraj Pune, Maharashtra was done by Niranjan Dass on 7 December 2005

Role in Adi dharm movement
They were instrumental in bringing social consciousness among the Dalits of Punjab (Juergensmeyer,1988:84-85). Mangu Ram Mugowalia, the founder of the Ad-Dharmi movement, visited the Dera Ballan and sought its support in popularizing the image of Guru Ravidass among
the Dalits of Punjab (Juergensmeyer, 1988:85). The association of the Dera with the Ad Dharm movement becomes further clear from the fact that Sarwan Dass, the then head of the Dera Ballan (11 October 1928 – 11 June 1972), offered juice to Mangoo Ram to open his fast-unto-death undertaken by him as a counter measure to that of Mahatma Gandhi‟s against the Communal Award in
1932 (Bawa, 2004:6). Although this movement petered out after the first general election in independent India, "…Deras such as that of Sarwan Das remain popular destinations for pilgrimage in the Punjab" (Juergensmeyer, 1988:85).
Dera Ballan also hosted the mammoth Dalit conference (13 December 1970) organised by Mangu Ram Jaspal, namesake of the famous Mangoo Ram, to revive the Ad-Dharmi movement.32 It was during this conference that the legendary Mangoo Ram and many other prominent leaders of the Ad-Dharmi movement commended the contribution of Sants of Dera Ballan towards the emancipation and empowerment of Dalits. Sant Sarwan Dass also met Dr. B.R. Ambedkar in 1948 in Delhi at his residence and encouraged him to fight
continuously for the emancipation of the downtrodden. During Dr. Ambedkar‟s visit to Punjab in 1951, Sarwan Dass sent a message wishing him success in his struggle for the emancipation of the Dalits (Bawa, 2004:6).

Declaration of a new religion

Originally, the holy book Granth Sahib was recited in Ravidassia gurudwaras. However, after the Vienna attack, Sant Samaj and the Ravidassia community and Dera Sach Khand at Ballan did away with the tradition, and started reading Amritbani Guru Ravidass that contains 240 hymns by Guru Ravidass from the teachings of Guru Ravidass, and some of which can also be found in the Granth Sahib.

In 2010 the Dera formally proclaimed their religion as Ravidassia Religion at Seer Goverdhanpur in Varanasi, the birthplace of Guru Ravidass. The holy book Amritbani Sri Guru Ravidass was also introduced and Ravidassia religion has the Har symbol and greeting as Jai Gurudev.

See also

 Sant Mat
 Adi Dharm
 Ramanand Dass

References

External links
 Dera Sach Khand Ballan web site
 Killing of Sikh Leader Sets Off Riots In India - New York Times
 Photographs from the headquarters of Dera Sach Khand in Ballan
 Begumpura Newspaper

Organisations based in Punjab, India
New religious movements
Politics of Punjab, India
Ravidassia
Religious organisations based in India
1942 establishments in India